Betty Kean (December 15, 1914 – September 29, 1986) was an actress and part of the 1950s era comedy duo the Kean Sisters with her sister Jane Kean. She married four times, to actors including Jim Backus and her last husband Lew Parker. She died in 1986 of cancer in Hollywood.

Biography
Kean was born in Hartford, Connecticut in 1914. She began her acting career in 1942, appearing in films like Moonlight Masquerade, Gals, Incorporated, Sing a Jingle and Hi, Good Lookin'!, among others.

During the 1950s she was part, along her sister Jane, of the comedy duo the Kean Sisters, which worked the nightclub circuit throughout the 1940s and 1950s and appeared on Broadway in the 1955 musical, Ankles Aweigh.

On television, Kean portrayed Amy Tucker on Leave It to Larry. Other TV shows on which she appeared included Naked City, The Andy Griffith Show, My World and Welcome to It, and The Love Boat.

One of her last television appearances was in the February 22, 1986, episode of The Facts of Life, “The Lady Who Came to Dinner” as a traveling vaudevillian performer whom Tootie hires for the entertainment during Blair’s 21st birthday.

Her final film credit was Dreamscape in 1984.

Personal life
Kean was married four times; to Roy Sedley from 1934 to 1936, to Frank Fay from 1937 to 1939, with whom she had one daughter, Cathy Jane Fay, to Jim Backus from 1939 to 1942 and lastly to Lew Parker from 1956 to 1972 with whom she had another daughter, Deirdre.

Death
Kean died of cancer in Los Angeles on September 29, 1986.

Selected filmography

Film
 Moonlight Masquerade (1942) - Mikki Marquette
 Gals, Incorporated (1943) - Bets Moran
 Sing a Jingle (1944) - Myrtle
 Hi, Good Lookin'! (1944) - Peggy
 Slightly Terrific (1944) - Marie Mason
 Murder in the Blue Room (1944) - Betty
 My Gal Loves Music (1944) - Peggy Quinn
 The Fifth Floor (1978) - Sophy
 The Seduction (1982) - Mrs. Caluso
 Dreamscape (1984) - Grandma

Television
 Fireside Theatre - Meet My Sister (1949) TV Episode
 Naked City - Make It Fifty Dollars and Add Love to Nona (1962) TV Episode .... Mrs. Kelvin
 The Andy Griffith Show - A Visit to Barney Fife (1967) TV Episode .... Ma Parker
 My World and Welcome to It - Seal in the Bedroom (1969) TV Episode .... Mrs. Monroe
 That Girl - That Girl's Daddy (1970) TV Episode .... Mrs. McCarty
 Happy Days - Fonzie the Father (1976) TV Episode .... Millie
 Police Woman - Night of the Full Moon (1976) TV Episode .... Charlene's Landlady
 The Bob Newhart Show - Of Mice and Men (1977) TV Episode .... Flo
 The Love Boat - Ex Plus Y/Golden Agers/Graham and Kelly (1977) TV Episode .... Mrs. Svenson
 Diff'rent Strokes - Sam's Missing (1985) TV Episode .... Sally Winkle
 The Facts of Life - The Lady Who Came to Dinner (1986) TV Episode .... Louise Le Beau

References

External links
 
 

American women comedians
1914 births
1986 deaths
American film actresses
American stage actresses
American television actresses
Deaths from cancer in California
Actresses from Connecticut
20th-century American actresses
20th-century American people